Catolaccus is a parasitic wasp genus in the family Pteromalidae. Catolaccus grandis has been used by cotton farmers in Texas to combat crop damage from the boll weevil.

Species 
 Catolaccus aeneoviridis (Girault, 1911)
 Catolaccus ater (Ratzeburg, 1852)
 Catolaccus coleophorae Dzhanokmen, 1990
 Catolaccus crassiceps (Masi 1911)
 Catolaccus cyaneus Girault, 1911
 Catolaccus cyanoideus Burks, 1954
 Catolaccus endonis Ishii, 1940
 Catolaccus fragariae Rohwer, 1934
 Catolaccus grandis (Burks 1954)
 Catolaccus helice (Walker, 1843)
 Catolaccus kansensis (Girault, 1917)
 Catolaccus kumatshjovi Dzhanokmen, 1980
 Catolaccus pallipes Ashmead, 1894
 Catolaccus tepicensis Ashmead, 1895
 Catolaccus victoria Burks, 1954

References

External links 

Pteromalidae